The largest cities of South Korea have an autonomous status equivalent to that of provinces. Seoul, the largest city and capital, is classified as a teukbyeolsi (Special City), while the next six-largest cities are classified as gwangyeoksi (Metropolitan Cities). Smaller cities are classified as si ("cities") and are under provincial jurisdiction, at the same level as counties.

City status

Classifications for large municipal cities 
The national government can designate cities of at least 500,000 inhabitants as special status cities. This status expands the scope of administrative authority delegated from the provincial government to the city government.

Big city
A big city is a city (other than a special city or a metropolitan city) that has a population greater than 500,000, and has been designated by an order of the national government under Article 198 of the Local Autonomy Act. Big municipal cities are given the power to subdivide themselves into non-autonomous districts. 

Due its legal status as an administrative city, Jeju City cannot be designated as a "big city" under the Local Autonomy Law, despite having an estimated population exceeding 500,000 as of 2022. The designation of "administrative city" was created by the law which granted special self-governing status to Jeju Province; that law specifically states that the Local Autonomy Act would not apply to administrative cities. As such, Jeju City does not enjoy special autonomy and only has the same legal powers as the much smaller Seogwipo City. The administrative authority of Jeju City is trying to expand the scope of administrative authority delegated from the provincial government to the city government.

Special-status city

A special-status city is a subclass of big municipal city that has a population greater than 1,500,000.

List 
 Notes
 The name "Seoul" does not originate from hanja. The official Chinese translation is written as /, which is a transcription based on the pronunciation of "Seoul", but / remains frequently used. As an affix or abbreviation, the character gyeong, which means "capital", is used.
 Seoul was designated a "Special Independent City" (Teukbyeol-jayusi) separate from Gyeonggi Province on August 16, 1946; it became a "Special City" on August 15, 1949.

Renamed cities

Dissolved cities

Claimed cities

See also 
 List of cities in South Korea by population
 Administrative divisions of South Korea

References

Sources 
 The Principal Cities of South Korea
 Korea.net-Facts about Korea
 Korea.net-Facts about Korea

External links 

 Largest cities in South Korea